

Events

Pre-1600
8 – Roman Empire general Tiberius defeats the Dalmatae on the river Bosna.
 435 – Deposed Ecumenical Patriarch of Constantinople Nestorius, considered the originator of Nestorianism, is exiled by Roman Emperor Theodosius II to a monastery in Egypt.
 881 – Battle of Saucourt-en-Vimeu: Louis III of France defeats the Vikings, an event celebrated in the poem Ludwigslied.
 908 – Battle of Eisenach: An invading Hungarian force defeats an East Frankish army under Duke Burchard of Thuringia.
1031 – Olaf II of Norway is canonized as Saint Olaf by Grimketel, the English Bishop of Selsey.
1057 – Frederik van Lotharingen elected as first Belgian Pope Stephen IX. 
1342 – The Siege of Algeciras commences during the Spanish Reconquista.
1492 – Christopher Columbus sets sail from Palos de la Frontera, Spain.
1527 – The first known letter from North America is sent by John Rut while at St. John's, Newfoundland.

1601–1900
1601 – Long War: Austria captures Transylvania in the Battle of Goroszló.
1645 – Thirty Years' War: The Second Battle of Nördlingen sees French forces defeating those of the Holy Roman Empire.
1678 – Robert LaSalle builds the Le Griffon, the first known ship built on the Great Lakes.
1778 – The theatre La Scala in Milan is inaugurated with the première of Antonio Salieri's Europa riconosciuta.
1795 – Treaty of Greenville is signed, ending the Northwest Indian War in the Ohio Country.
1811 – First ascent of Jungfrau, third highest summit in the Bernese Alps by brothers Johann Rudolf and Hieronymus Meyer.
1829 – The Treaty of Lewistown is signed by the Shawnee and Seneca peoples, exchanging land in Ohio for land west of the Mississippi River.
1852 – Harvard University wins the first Boat Race between Yale University and Harvard. The race is also known as the first ever American intercollegiate athletic event.
1859 – The American Dental Association is founded in Niagara Falls, New York.
1900 – The Firestone Tire and Rubber Company is founded.

1901–present
1903 – Macedonian rebels in Kruševo proclaim the Kruševo Republic, which exists for only ten days before Ottoman Turks lay waste to the town.
1907 – Judge Kenesaw Mountain Landis fines Standard Oil of Indiana a record $29.4 million for illegal rebating to freight carriers; the conviction and fine are later reversed on appeal.
1914 – World War I: Germany declares war against France, while Romania declares its neutrality.
1921 – Major League Baseball Commissioner Kenesaw Mountain Landis confirms the ban of the eight Chicago Black Sox, the day after they were acquitted by a Chicago court.
1936 – Jesse Owens wins the 100 metre dash, defeating Ralph Metcalfe, at the Berlin Olympics.
  1936   – A fire wipes out Kursha-2 in the Meshchera Lowlands, Ryazan Oblast, Russia, killing 1,200 and leaving only 20 survivors.
1940 – World War II: Italian forces begin the invasion of British Somaliland.
1946 – Santa Claus Land, the world's first themed amusement park, opens in Santa Claus, Indiana, United States.
1948 – Whittaker Chambers accuses Alger Hiss of being a communist and a spy for the Soviet Union.
1949 – The Basketball Association of America and the National Basketball League finalize the merger that would create the National Basketball Association.
1958 – The world's first nuclear submarine, the USS Nautilus, becomes the first vessel to complete a submerged transit of the geographical North Pole.
1959 – Portugal's state police force PIDE fires upon striking workers in Bissau, Portuguese Guinea, killing over 50 people.
1960 – Niger gains independence from France.
1972 – The United States Senate ratifies the Anti-Ballistic Missile Treaty.
1975 – A privately chartered Boeing 707 strikes a mountain peak and crashes near Agadir, Morocco, killing 188.
1977 – Tandy Corporation announces the TRS-80, one of the world's first mass-produced personal computers.
1981 – Senegalese opposition parties, under the leadership of Mamadou Dia, launch the Antiimperialist Action Front – Suxxali Reew Mi.
1997 – Oued El-Had and Mezouara massacre in Algeria: A total of 116 villagers killed, 40 in Oued El-Had and 76 in Mezouara.
  1997   – The tallest free-standing structure in the Southern Hemisphere, Sky Tower in downtown Auckland, New Zealand, opens after two-and-a-half years of construction.
2004 – The pedestal of the Statue of Liberty reopens after being closed since the September 11 attacks.
2005 – President of Mauritania Maaouya Ould Sid'Ahmed Taya is overthrown in a military coup while attending the funeral of King Fahd in Saudi Arabia.
2007 – Former deputy director of the Chilean secret police Raúl Iturriaga is captured after having been on the run following a conviction for kidnapping.
2010 – Widespread rioting erupts in Karachi, Pakistan, after the assassination of a local politician, leaving at least 85 dead and at least 17 billion Pakistani rupees (US$200 million) in damage.
2014 – A 6.1 magnitude earthquake kills at least 617 people and injures more than 2,400 in Yunnan, China.
  2014   – The genocide of Yazidis by ISIL begins.
2018 – Two burka-clad men kill 29 people and injure more than 80 in a suicide attack on a Shia mosque in eastern Afghanistan.
2019 – Six hundred protesters, including opposition leader Lyubov Sobol, are arrested in an election protest in Moscow, Russia.
  2019   – Twenty-three people are killed and 23 injured in a shooting in El Paso, Texas.

Births

Pre-1600
1442 – Galeotto I Pico, Duke of Mirandola (d. 1499)
1486 – Imperia Cognati, Italian courtesan (d. 1512)
1491 – Maria of Jülich-Berg, German noblewoman (d. 1543)
1509 – Étienne Dolet, French scholar and translator (d. 1546)

1601–1900
1622 – Wolfgang Julius, Count of Hohenlohe-Neuenstein, German field marshal (d. 1698)
1692 – John Henley, English minister and poet (d. 1759)
1766 – Aaron Chorin, Hungarian rabbi and author (d. 1844)
1770 – Frederick William III of Prussia (d. 1840)
1803 – Joseph Paxton, English gardener and architect, designed The Crystal Palace (d. 1865)
1808 – Hamilton Fish, American lawyer and politician, 26th United States Secretary of State (d. 1893)
1811 – Elisha Otis, American businessman, founded the Otis Elevator Company (d. 1861)
1817 – Archduke Albrecht, Duke of Teschen (d. 1895)
1823 – Thomas Francis Meagher, Irish-American revolutionary and military leader, territorial governor of Montana (d. 1867)
1832 – Ivan Zajc, Croatian composer, conductor, and director (d. 1914)
1840 – John Bigham, 1st Viscount Mersey, English jurist and politician (d. 1929)
1850 – Reginald Heber Roe, English-Australian swimmer, tennis player, and academic (d. 1926)
1856 – Alfred Deakin, Australian lawyer and politician, 2nd Prime Minister of Australia (d. 1919)
1860 – William Kennedy Dickson, French-Scottish actor, director, and producer (d. 1935)
1863 – Géza Gárdonyi, Hungarian author and journalist (d. 1922)
1867 – Stanley Baldwin, English businessman and politician, Prime Minister of the United Kingdom (d. 1947)
1871 – Vernon Louis Parrington, American historian and scholar (d. 1929)
1872 – Haakon VII of Norway (d. 1957)
1886 – Maithili Sharan Gupt, Indian poet and playwright (d. 1964)
1887 – Rupert Brooke,  English poet (d. 1915) 
  1887   – August Wesley, Finnish journalist, trade unionist, and revolutionary (d. ?)
1890 – Konstantin Melnikov, Russian architect, designed the Rusakov Workers' Club (d. 1974)
1894 – Harry Heilmann, American baseball player and sportscaster (d. 1951)
1895 – Allen Bathurst, Lord Apsley, English politician (d. 1942)
1896 – Ralph Horween, American football player and coach (d. 1997)
1899 – Louis Chiron, Monegasque race car driver (d. 1979)
1900 – Ernie Pyle, American soldier and journalist (d. 1945)
  1900   – John T. Scopes, American educator (d. 1970)

1901–present
1901 – John C. Stennis, American lawyer and politician (d. 1995)
  1901   – Stefan Wyszyński, Polish cardinal (d. 1981)
1902 – Regina Jonas, German rabbi (d. 1944)
  1902   – David Buttolph, American film composer (d. 1983)
1903 – Habib Bourguiba, Tunisian journalist and politician, 1st President of the Republic of Tunisia (d. 2000)
1904 – Dolores del Río, Mexican actress (d. 1983)
  1904   – Clifford D. Simak, American journalist and author (d. 1988)
1905 – Franz König, Austrian cardinal (d. 2004)
1907 – Lawrence Brown, American trombonist and composer (d. 1988)
  1907   – Ernesto Geisel, Brazilian general and politician, 29th President of Brazil (d. 1996)
  1907   – Yang Shangkun, Chinese politician, and 4th President of China (d.1998)
1909 – Walter Van Tilburg Clark, American author and educator (d. 1971)
1911 – Alex McCrindle, Scottish actor and producer (d. 1990)
1912 – Fritz Hellwig, German politician (d. 2017)
1913 – Mel Tolkin, Ukrainian-American screenwriter and producer (d. 2007)
1916 – Shakeel Badayuni, Indian poet and songwriter (d. 1970)
  1916   – José Manuel Moreno, Argentinian footballer and manager (d. 1978)
1917 – Les Elgart, American trumpet player and bandleader (d. 1995)
1918 – James MacGregor Burns, American historian, political scientist, and author (d. 2014)
  1918   – Sidney Gottlieb, American chemist and theorist (d. 1999)
  1918   – Larry Haines, American actor (d. 2008)
  1918   – Eddie Jefferson, American singer-songwriter (d. 1979)
1920 – Norman Dewis, English test driver and engineer (d. 2019)
  1920   – Max Fatchen, Australian journalist and author (d. 2012)
  1920   – P. D. James, English author (d. 2014)
  1920   – Charlie Shavers, American trumpet player and composer (d. 1971)
  1920   – Elmar Tampõld, Estonian-Canadian architect (d. 2013)
1921 – Richard Adler, American composer and producer (d. 2012)
  1921   – Hayden Carruth, American poet and critic (d. 2008)
  1921   – Marilyn Maxwell, American actress (d. 1972)
1922 – John Eisenhower, American historian, general, and diplomat, 45th United States Ambassador to Belgium (d. 2013)
1923 – Jean Hagen, American actress (d. 1977)
  1923   – Pope Shenouda III of Alexandria (d. 2012)
1924 – Connie Converse, American musician and singer-songwriter
1924 – Leon Uris, American soldier and author (d. 2003)
1925 – Marv Levy, American-Canadian football player, coach, and manager
  1925   – Lewis Rowland, American neurologist (d. 2017)
1926 – Rona Anderson, Scottish actress (d. 2013)
  1926   – Tony Bennett, American singer and actor
  1926   – Anthony Sampson, English journalist and author (d. 2004)
  1926   – Gordon Scott, American actor (d. 2007)
1928 – Cécile Aubry, French actress, director, and screenwriter (d. 2010)
  1928   – Henning Moritzen, Danish actor (d. 2012)
1930 – James Komack, American actor, director, producer, and screenwriter (d. 1997)
1933 – Pat Crawford, Australian cricketer (d. 2009)
1934 – Haystacks Calhoun, American wrestler and actor (d. 1989)
  1934   – Michael Chapman, English bassoon player (d. 2005)
  1934   – Jonas Savimbi, Angolan general, founded UNITA (d. 2002)
1935 – John Erman, American actor, director, and producer (d. 2021)
  1935   – Georgy Shonin, Ukrainian-Russian general, pilot, and cosmonaut (d. 1997)
  1935   – Vic Vogel, Canadian pianist, composer, and bandleader (d. 2019)
1936 – Jerry G. Bishop, American radio and television host (d. 2013)
  1936   – Edward Petherbridge, English actor 
1937 – Steven Berkoff, English actor, director, and playwright
  1937   – Roland Burris, American lawyer and politician, 39th Illinois Attorney General
  1937   – Duncan Sharpe, Pakistani-Australian cricketer
1938 – Terry Wogan, Irish radio and television host (d. 2016)
1939 – Jimmie Nicol, English drummer 
  1939   – Apoorva Sengupta, Indian general and cricketer (d. 2013)
1940 – Lance Alworth, American football player
  1940   – Martin Sheen, American actor and producer
  1940   – James Tyler, American guitarist and songwriter (d. 2010)
1941 – Beverly Lee, American singer
  1941   – Martha Stewart, American businesswoman, publisher, and author, founded Martha Stewart Living Omnimedia
1943 – Béla Bollobás, Hungarian-English mathematician and academic
  1943   – Princess Christina, Mrs. Magnuson of Sweden
  1943   – Steven Millhauser, American novelist and short story writer
1944 – Morris Berman, American historian and social critic  
  1944   – Nino Bravo, Spanish singer (d. 1973)
1945 – Eamon Dunphy, Irish footballer and journalist
1946 – Robert Ayling, English businessman
  1946   – Jack Straw, English lawyer and politician, Shadow Deputy Prime Minister of the United Kingdom
  1946   – Syreeta Wright, American singer-songwriter (d. 2004)
  1946   – John York, American bass player, songwriter, and producer 
1947 – Ralph Wright, English footballer (d. 2020)
1948 – Jean-Pierre Raffarin, French lawyer and politician, 166th Prime Minister of France
1949 – Philip Casnoff, American actor and director
  1949   – B. B. Dickerson, American bass player and songwriter 
  1949   – Sue Slipman, English politician
1950 – Linda Howard, American author
  1950   – John Landis, American actor, director, producer, and screenwriter
  1950   – Jo Marie Payton, American actress and singer
  1950   – Ernesto Samper, Colombian economist and politician, 29th President of Colombia
1951 – Marcel Dionne, Canadian ice hockey player
  1951   – Jay North, American actor
1952 – Osvaldo Ardiles, Argentinian footballer and manager
1953 – Ian Bairnson, Scottish saxophonist and keyboard player
  1953   – Marlene Dumas, South African painter
1954 – Michael Arthur, English physician and academic
  1954   – Gary Peters, English footballer and manager
1956 – Kirk Brandon, English singer-songwriter and guitarist 
  1956   – Todd Christensen, American football player and sportscaster (d. 2013)
  1956   – Dave Cloud, American singer-songwriter and actor (d. 2015)
  1956   – Balwinder Sandhu, Indian cricketer and coach
1957 – Bodo Rudwaleit, German footballer and manager
  1957   – Kate Wilkinson, New Zealand lawyer and politician, 11th New Zealand Minister of Conservation
1958 – Lindsey Hilsum, English journalist and author
  1958   – Ana Kokkinos, Australian director and screenwriter
1959 – Martin Atkins, English drummer and producer 
  1959   – Mike Gminski, American basketball player and sportscaster
  1959   – John C. McGinley, American actor and producer
  1959   – Koichi Tanaka, Japanese chemist and engineer, Nobel Prize laureate
1960 – Tim Mayotte, American tennis player and coach
  1960   – Gopal Sharma, Indian cricketer
1961 – Molly Hagan, American actress
  1961   – Nick Harvey, English politician, Minister of State for the Armed Forces
  1961   – Lee Rocker, American bassist 
1963 – Tasmin Archer, English pop singer
  1963   – Frano Botica, New Zealand rugby player and coach
  1963   – James Hetfield, American singer-songwriter and guitarist 
  1963   – David Knox, Australian rugby player
  1963   – Ed Roland, American singer-songwriter, guitarist, and producer 
  1963   – Lisa Ann Walter, American actress, producer, and screenwriter
  1963   – Isaiah Washington, American actor and producer
1964 – Lucky Dube, South African singer and keyboard player (d. 2007)
  1964   – Ralph Knibbs, British rugby union player
  1964   – Nate McMillan, American basketball player and coach
  1964   – Kevin Sumlin, American football player and coach
  1964   – Abhisit Vejjajiva, English-Thai economist and politician, 27th Prime Minister of Thailand
1966 – Brent Butt, Canadian actor, producer, and screenwriter
  1966   – Gizz Butt, English singer-songwriter and guitarist 
  1966   – Eric Esch, American wrestler, boxer, and mixed martial artist
1967 – Mathieu Kassovitz, French actor, director, producer, and screenwriter, founded MNP Entreprise
  1967   – Skin, English singer and guitarist 
1968 – Rod Beck, American baseball player (d. 2007)
1969 – Doug Overton, American basketball player and coach
1970 – Stephen Carpenter, American guitarist and songwriter
  1970   – Gina G, Australian singer-songwriter 
  1970   – Masahiro Sakurai, Japanese video game designer
1971 – Forbes Johnston, Scottish footballer (d. 2007)
  1971   – DJ Spinderella, American DJ, rapper, producer, and actress 
1972 – Sandis Ozoliņš, Latvian ice hockey player and politician
1973 – Jay Cutler, American bodybuilder
  1973   – Nikos Dabizas, Greek footballer
  1973   – Michael Ealy, American actor
  1973   – Chris Murphy, American politician
1975 – Wael Gomaa, Egyptian footballer
  1975   – Argyro Strataki, Greek heptathlete
1976 – Troy Glaus, American baseball player
1977 – Tom Brady, American football player 
  1977   – Justin Lehr, American baseball player
  1977   – Óscar Pereiro, Spanish cyclist and footballer
1978 – Joi Chua, Singaporean singer-songwriter and actress
  1978   – Mariusz Jop, Polish footballer
  1978   – Jenny Tinmouth, English motorcycle racer
  1978   – Dimitrios Zografakis, Greek footballer
1979 – Evangeline Lilly, Canadian actress
1980 – Nadia Ali, Libyan-American singer-songwriter 
  1980   – Dominic Moore, Canadian ice hockey player
  1980   – Tony Pashos, American football player
  1980   – Brandan Schieppati, American singer-songwriter and guitarist 
  1980   – Hannah Simone, Canadian television host and actress
1981 – Fikirte Addis, Ethiopian fashion designer
  1981   – Travis Bowyer, American baseball player
  1981   – Pablo Ibáñez, Spanish footballer
1982 – Kaspar Kokk, Estonian skier
  1982   – Jesse Lumsden, Canadian bobsledder and football player
  1982   – Damien Sandow, American wrestler
1983 – Ryan Carter, American ice hockey player
  1983   – Mark Reynolds, American baseball player
1984 – Yasin Avcı, Turkish footballer
  1984   – Sunil Chhetri, Indian footballer
  1984   – Matt Joyce, American baseball player
  1984   – Ryan Lochte, American swimmer
  1984   – Chris Maurer, American singer and bass player 
1985 – Georgina Haig, Australian actress
  1985   – Brent Kutzle, American bass player and producer 
  1985   – Ats Purje, Estonian footballer
  1985   – Sonny Bill Williams, New Zealand rugby player and boxer
1986 – Charlotte Casiraghi, Monégasque journalist, co-founded Ever Manifesto
  1986   – Darya Domracheva, Belarusian biathlete
1987 – Kim Hyung-jun, South Korean singer and dancer  
  1987   – Chris McQueen, Australian-English rugby league player
1988 – Denny Cardin, Italian footballer 
  1988   – Leigh Tiffin, American football player
  1988   – Sven Ulreich, German footballer
1989 – Jules Bianchi, French race car driver (d. 2015)
  1989   – Sam Hutchinson, English footballer
  1989   – Tyrod Taylor, American football player
  1989   – Nick Viergever, Dutch footballer
1990 – Jourdan Dunn, English model
  1990   – Kang Min-kyung, South Korean singer
1992 – Gamze Bulut, Turkish runner
  1992   – Gesa Felicitas Krause, German runner
  1992   – Diāna Marcinkēviča, Latvian tennis player
  1992   – Aljon Mariano, Filipino basketball player
  1992   – Lum Rexhepi, Finnish footballer
  1992   – Karlie Kloss, American fashion model
1993 – Ola Abidogun, English sprinter
  1993   – Yurina Kumai, Japanese singer 
1994 – Manaia Cherrington, New Zealand rugby league player
  1994   – Esther Earl, American author, vlogger, and online personality. (d. 2010) Celebrated annually as Esther day
  1994   – Todd Gurley, American football player
1995 – Victoria Kan, Russian tennis player

Deaths

Pre-1600
 908 – Burchard, duke of Thuringia
   908   – Egino, duke of Thuringia
   908   – Rudolf I, bishop of Würzburg
 925 – Cao, Chinese empress dowager
 979 – Thietmar, margrave of Meissen
1003 – At-Ta'i, Abbasid caliph (b. 929)
1355 – Bartholomew de Burghersh, 1st Baron Burghersh, English nobleman
1460 – James II, king of Scotland (b. 1430)
1527 – Scaramuccia Trivulzio, Italian cardinal
1530 – Francesco Ferruccio, Italian captain (b. 1489)
1546 – Antonio da Sangallo the Younger, Italian architect, designed the Apostolic Palace (b. 1484)
  1546   – Étienne Dolet, French scholar and translator (b. 1509)

1601–1900
1604 – Bernardino de Mendoza, Spanish commander and diplomat (b. 1540)
1621 – Guillaume du Vair, French lawyer and author (b. 1556)
1712 – Joshua Barnes, English historian and scholar (b. 1654)
1720 – Anthonie Heinsius, Dutch politician (b. 1641)
1721 – Grinling Gibbons, Dutch-English sculptor and woodcarver (b. 1648)
1761 – Johann Matthias Gesner, German scholar and academic (b. 1691)
1773 – Stanisław Konarski, Polish poet and playwright (b. 1700)
1780 – Étienne Bonnot de Condillac, French epistemologist and philosopher (b. 1715)
1792 – Richard Arkwright, English engineer and businessman (b. 1732)
1797 – Jeffery Amherst, 1st Baron Amherst, English field marshal and politician, Colonial Governor of Virginia (b. 1717)
1805 – Christopher Anstey, English author and poet (b. 1724)
1835 – Wenzel Müller, Austrian composer and conductor (b. 1767)
1839 – Dorothea von Schlegel, German author and translator (b. 1763)
1857 – Eugène Sue, French author and politician (b. 1804)
1866 – Gábor Klauzál, Hungarian politician, Hungarian Minister of Agriculture (b. 1804)
1867 – Philipp August Böckh, German historian and scholar (b. 1785)
1877 – William B. Ogden, American businessman and politician, 1st Mayor of Chicago (b. 1805)
1879 – Joseph Severn, English painter (b. 1793)
1894 – George Inness, American painter (b. 1825)

1901–present
1913 – William Lyne, Australian politician, 13th Premier of New South Wales (b. 1844)
1916 – Roger Casement, Irish poet and activist (b. 1864)
1917 – Ferdinand Georg Frobenius, German mathematician and academic (b. 1849)
1920 – Peeter Süda, Estonian organist and composer (b. 1883)
1922 – Ture Malmgren, Swedish journalist and politician (b. 1851)
1924 – Joseph Conrad, Polish-born British novelist (b. 1857)
1925 – William Bruce, Australian cricketer (b. 1864)
1929 – Emile Berliner, German-American inventor and businessman, invented the phonograph  (b. 1851)
  1929   – Thorstein Veblen, American economist and sociologist (b. 1857)
1936 – Konstantin Konik, Estonian surgeon and politician, 19th Estonian Minister of Education (b. 1873)
1942 – Richard Willstätter, German-Swiss chemist and academic, Nobel Prize laureate (b. 1872)
1943 – Frumka Płotnicka, Polish resistance fighter during World War II (b. 1914)
1949 – Ignotus, Hungarian poet and author (b. 1869)
1954 – Colette, French novelist and journalist (b. 1873)
1958 – Peter Collins, English race car driver (b. 1931)
1959 – Herb Byrne, Australian footballer (b. 1887)
1961 – Hilda Rix Nicholas, Australian artist (b. 1884)
1964 – Flannery O'Connor, American short story writer and novelist (b. 1925)
1966 – Lenny Bruce, American comedian, actor, and screenwriter (b. 1925) 
1968 – Konstantin Rokossovsky, Marshal of the Soviet Union during World War II (b. 1896)
1969 – Alexander Mair, Australian politician, 26th Premier of New South Wales (b. 1889)
1972 – Giannis Papaioannou, Turkish-Greek composer (b. 1913)
1973 – Richard Marshall, American general (b. 1895)
1974 – Edgar Johan Kuusik, Estonian architect and interior designer (b. 1888)
1975 – Andreas Embirikos, Greek poet and photographer (b. 1901)
1977 – Makarios III, Cypriot archbishop and politician, 1st President of the Republic of Cyprus (b. 1913)
  1977   – Alfred Lunt, American actor and director (b. 1892)
1979 – Bertil Ohlin, Swedish economist and politician, Nobel Prize laureate (b. 1899)
  1979   – Angelos Terzakis, Greek author and playwright (b. 1907)
1983 – Carolyn Jones, American actress (b. 1930)
1995 – Ida Lupino, English-American actress and director (b. 1918)
  1995   – Edward Whittemore, American soldier and author (b. 1933)
1996 – Jørgen Garde, Danish admiral (b. 1939)
1997 – Pietro Rizzuto, Italian-Canadian lawyer and politician (b. 1934)
1998 – Alfred Schnittke, Russian composer and journalist (b. 1934)
1999 – Rod Ansell, Australian hunter (b. 1953)
  1999   – Byron Farwell, American historian and author (b. 1921)
2000 – Joann Lõssov, Estonian basketball player and coach (b. 1921)
2001 – Christopher Hewett, English actor and director (b. 1922)
2003 – Roger Voudouris, American singer-songwriter and guitarist (b. 1954)
2004 – Henri Cartier-Bresson, French photographer and painter (b. 1908)
2005 – Françoise d'Eaubonne, French author and poet (b. 1920)
2006 – Arthur Lee, American singer-songwriter, guitarist, and producer (b. 1945)
  2006   – Elisabeth Schwarzkopf, German-English soprano and actress (b. 1915)
2007 – John Gardner, English author (b. 1926)
  2007   – Peter Thorup, Danish singer-songwriter, guitarist, and producer (b. 1948)
2008 – Skip Caray, American sportscaster (b. 1939)
  2008   – Erik Darling, American singer-songwriter (b. 1933)
  2008   – Aleksandr Solzhenitsyn, Russian novelist, dramatist and historian, Nobel Prize laureate  (b. 1918)
2009 – Nikolaos Makarezos, Greek soldier and politician, Deputy Prime Minister of Greece (b. 1919)
2010 – Bobby Hebb, American singer-songwriter (b. 1938)
2011 – William Sleator, American author (b. 1945)
  2011   – Bubba Smith, American football player and actor (b. 1945)
2012 – Frank Evans, American baseball player, coach, and manager (b. 1921)
  2012   – Martin Fleischmann, Czech-English chemist and academic (b. 1927)
  2012   – Paul McCracken, American economist and academic (b. 1915)
  2012   – John Pritchard, American basketball player (b. 1927)
2013 – John Coombs, English-Monegasque race car driver and businessman (b. 1922)
  2013   – Jack English Hightower, American lawyer and politician (b. 1926)
  2013   – Jack Hynes, Scottish-American soccer player and manager (b. 1920)
2014 – Miangul Aurangzeb, Pakistani captain and politician, 19th Governor of Khyber Pakhtunkhwa (b. 1928) 
  2014   – Edward Clancy, Australian cardinal (b. 1923)
  2014   – Dorothy Salisbury Davis, American author (b. 1916)
  2014   – Kenny Drew, Jr., American pianist and composer (b. 1958)
  2014   – Lydia Yu-Jose, Filipino political scientist and academic (b. 1944)
2015 – Robert Conquest, English-American historian, poet, and academic (b. 1917)
  2015   – Mel Farr, American football player and businessman (b. 1944) 
  2015   – Coleen Gray, American actress (b. 1922)
  2015   – Margot Loyola, Chilean singer-songwriter and guitarist (b. 1918)
  2015   – Johanna Quandt, German businesswoman (b. 1926)
  2015   – Jef Murray, American artist and author (b. 1960)
2020 – John Hume, Northern Irish politician (b. 1937)
2022 – Jackie Walorski, American politician (b. 1963)

Holidays and observances
 Anniversary of the Killing of Pidjiguiti (Guinea-Bissau)
 Armed Forces Day (Equatorial Guinea)
 Christian feast day:
 George Freeman Bragg, W. E. B. Du Bois (Episcopal Church)
 Lydia of Thyatira
 Myrrhbearers (Lutheran Church)
 Nicodemus
 Olaf II of Norway (Translation of the relic)
 Stephen (Discovery of the relic)
 Waltheof of Melrose
 August 3 (Eastern Orthodox liturgics)
 Flag Day (Venezuela)
 Independence Day, celebrates the independence of Niger from France in 1960.
Arbor Day (Niger) 
 National Guard Day (Venezuela)

References

External links

 
 
 

Days of the year
August